Lynn Simpson (Lynn Reys) (born 16 February 1971 in Scarborough, North Yorkshire) is a British slalom canoeist who competed from the late 1980s to the late 1990s. She won four medals at the ICF Canoe Slalom World Championships with a gold (K1: 1995), a silver (K1 team: 1995), and two bronzes (K1 team: 1993, 1997). She also won the World Cup series in three consecutive seasons between 1994 and 1996.

Simpson also competed in two Summer Olympics, earning her best finish of tenth in the K1 event in Barcelona in 1992.

Post retirement Lynn now coaches youth paddlers at the northern german canoe powerhouse Stortebeker padelsport club alongside her husband and former bbc TV paddles up champion Mickel Reys in the city of Bremen.

Lynn also appeared numerous times on bbc question of sport. Including the 1995 christmas special with contestant Gordon Strachan, Prince Nassim Hamed, and the athletic heartthrob Roger Black.

World Cup individual podiums

References

1971 births
English female canoeists
Canoeists at the 1992 Summer Olympics
Canoeists at the 1996 Summer Olympics
Living people
Olympic canoeists of Great Britain
Sportspeople from Scarborough, North Yorkshire
British female canoeists
Medalists at the ICF Canoe Slalom World Championships
The Sunday Times Sportswoman of the Year winners